Diego Nicolás Riolfo Pérez (born 8 January 1990 in Montevideo), is a Uruguayan professional footballer who plays as a forward.

Football career
Riolfo spent his first year as a senior with Central Español, making his debut on 28 August 2010, against Cerro. He scored his first professional goal on 4 December, against Danubio. In the 2011 summer he joined Montevideo Wanderers, but found his chances limited, only making six appearances in the whole season.

In July 2012, Riolfo moved abroad, signing a one-year loan deal with Recreativo de Huelva. On 8 September he made his debut for Recre, against Real Murcia.

References

External links
 

  

1990 births
Living people
Uruguayan footballers
Uruguayan expatriate footballers
Footballers from Montevideo
Association football forwards
Central Español players
Montevideo Wanderers F.C. players
Recreativo de Huelva players
Club Necaxa footballers
Godoy Cruz Antonio Tomba footballers
Uruguayan Primera División players
Segunda División players
Liga MX players
Uruguayan expatriate sportspeople in Mexico
Uruguayan expatriate sportspeople in Spain
Expatriate footballers in Mexico
Expatriate footballers in Spain